The Right Stuff is the debut studio album by American singer and actress Vanessa Williams, released on June 6, 1988, by Wing Records. It includes the singles "The Right Stuff", "(He's Got) The Look", "Dreamin'" and "Darlin' I". The album and its singles were well received by both the urban and pop markets. It was eventually certified Gold by the Recording Industry Association of America (RIAA) for sales in excess of 500,000 and earned Williams three Grammy Award nominations.

Track listing

Production
Produced by Amir-Salaam Bayyan, David Paul Bryant, Lewis A. Martineé, Donald Robinson, Larry Robinson, Darryl Ross, Rex Salas
Additional [background] vocals: Chuckii Booker, Johnny Gill (track 1), Niki Haris (tracks 2, 7, 10), Rachelle Ferrell (track 3), Kipper Jones (tracks 1, 2, 8) 
Engineers: Mike Bona, David Bianco, Gerry Brown, Craig Burbridge, Peter Dlugokencky, Michael Frenke, Lewis A. Martinee, Allen Scott Plotkin, Paul Scott, Steve Shepherd, Mike Tarsia, Steve Van Arden, Erik Zobler, Jared Held
Assistant engineers: Sabrina Burchanek, Cliff Jones, Bob Loftus, Gill Morales, Adam Silverman, Dennis Stefani, John VanNest
Mixing: Rick Alonso, David Bianco, Lewis A. Martinee, Donald Robinson, Mike Tarsia, Erik Zobler, Jared Held
Remixing: Rod Hui
Mix assistant: Steve Holroyd
Editing and post-production: Ed Eckstine, Eric "Vietnam" Sadler, Christopher Shaw, Hank Shocklee, Bill Stephney

Charts

Weekly charts

Year-end charts

Certifications

Notes

References

1988 debut albums
Albums recorded at Sigma Sound Studios
Albums recorded at Westlake Recording Studios
Vanessa Williams albums
Wing Records albums